The 1998 Winter Olympics torch relay was run from December 19, 1997 until February 7, 1998 prior to the 1998 Winter Olympics in Nagano. Midori Ito lit the cauldron at the opening ceremony.

Route

Japan
In December 1997, Midori Ito, silver medalist in figure skating at the 1992 Winter Olympics and Eishiro Saito, Chairman of the Nagano Olympic Organizing Committee, brought the Olympic Torch to Ryutaro Hashimoto, at the time the Prime Minister of Japan.

Nagano Prefecture

Eastern Japan route
23 January: Kawakami, Minamiaiki, Minamimaki, Kitaaiki
24 January: Koumi, Yachiho, Sakumachi, Usuda
25 January: Saku, Karuizawa
26 January: Miyota, Komoro, Kitamimaki
27 January: Asashina, Mochizuki, Tateshina
29 January: Wada, Nagato, Takeshi
30 January: Maruko, Tōbu, Sanada
31 January: Aoki, Ueda
1 February: Sakae, Nozawaonsen
2 February: Kijimaidara, Iiyama, Toyota
3 February: Yamanouchi, Nakano
4 February: Shinano, Toyono, Samizu
5 February: Obuse, Takayama, Suzaka

Pacific Ocean route
23 January: Urugi, Neba, Hiraya, Namiai
24 January: Seinaiji, Achi, Iida
25 January: Shimojō, Anan, Yasuoka
26 January: Tenryū, Minamishinano, Kami
27 January: Takagi, Takamori, Matsukawa, Oshika
29 January: Nakagawa, Iijima, Komagane
30 January: Miyada, Hase, Takatō
31 January: Ina, Minamiminowa, Minowa
1 February: Tatsuno, Fujimi, Hara
2 February: Chino, Suwa
3 February: Shimosuwa, Okaya
4 February: Ōoka, Ogawa, Nakajō
5 February: Kinasa, Togakushi

Japan Sea route
23 January: Otari, Hakuba
24 January: Miasa, Yasaka, Ōmachi
25 January: Ikeda, Matsukawa
27 January: Yamaguchi, Nagiso, Ōkuwa, Agematsu
28 January: Mitake, Ōtaki, Kaida
29 January: Kisofukushima, Hiyoshi, Kiso, Narakawa
30 January: Shiojiri, Asahi, Yamagata
31 January: Matsumoto, Hata
1 February: Nagawa, Azumi, Azusagawa
2 February: Misato, Horigane, Toyoshina
3 February: Hotaka, Akashina, Shiga
4 February: Ikusaka, Honjō, Sakakita, Omi, Sakai
5 February: Sakaki, Kamiyamada, Togura, Koshoku

References

External links
1998 torch relay via IOC website

Torch Relay, 1998 Winter Olympics
Olympic torch relays